The Petrosport Stadium (Egyptian Pronunciation: Estad Petrosport) is a multi-use stadium with an all-seated capacity of 16,000 located in Cairo Governorate, Egypt.  It was completed in 2006. It is the home for ENPPI and other Petrol clubs in Egypt. Zamalek also play the majority of their home games at the Petrosport Stadium.

References

External links
, Egypt at worldstadiums.com

ENPPI SC
Football venues in Egypt
Stadiums in Cairo
Multi-purpose stadiums in Egypt
Egypt
Sports venues completed in 2006
Athletics (track and field) venues in Egypt
Football in Cairo
21st-century architecture in Egypt